Kavakbaşı is a town (belde) in Mutki District, Bitlis Province, Turkey. Its population is 2,529 (2021).

References

Towns in Turkey
Populated places in Bitlis Province
Mutki District